An indirect presidential election (officially the 4th Federal Convention) was held in West Germany on 1 July 1964. President Heinrich Lübke was renominated by the Christian Democratic Union. The Free Democratic Party nominated justice minister Ewald Bucher. The Social Democratic Party was divided. The official party line was that they supported President Lübke's re-election. Some have speculated this was a first move towards the grand-coalition that brought Kurt Kiesinger to power two years later. However, the high number of abstentions seems to indicate that not all members of the SPD caucus agreed with this move, as does the fact that Ewald Bucher received at least 19 votes from outside his own party.

Composition of the Federal Convention 
The President is elected by the Federal Convention consisting of all the members of the Bundestag and an equal number of delegates representing the states. These are divided proportionally by population to each state, and each state's delegation is divided among the political parties represented in its parliament so as to reflect the partisan proportions in the parliament.

Source: Eine Dokumentation aus Anlass der Wahl des Bundespräsidenten am 18. März 2012

Results

References

Presidential election
1964
West German presidential election
West German presidential election
Heinrich Lübke